Raihan Mujib is a Bangladeshi film director.

Biography
Mujib's debut direction was Hero. He was the director Bhaijan  which film won National Film Award in one category in 1989. He also directed films like Kajer Beti Rahima, Teji Sontan and Atmo Ohongkar. These films are selected for preservation in Bangladesh Film Archive. He also directed Jamin Nai. Shakti Kapoor was the main antagonist in this film. His last direction was Jogot Songsar.

Selected filmography
 Hero
 Bhaijan
 Kajer Beti Rahima
 Agnipurush
 Atmo Ohongkar
 Prem Preeti
 Raja Gunda
 Akheri Mokabela
 Hingsar Agun
 Teji Sontan
 Jamin Nai
 Jogot Songsar

References

Living people
Bangladeshi film directors
Year of birth missing (living people)